FERM Domain Containing 4B is a gene, located on human Chromosome 3 at 3p14.1, that encodes FERM Domain Containing Protein 4b.

References

Genes on human chromosome 3